Balloons over Waikato is an annual hot air balloon festival held in Hamilton, New Zealand since 1999 by the non-profit organization Balloons over Waikato Trust. The event spans five days during autumn and attracts both local and overseas balloonists. The Festival is held primarily at Innes Common, at Hamilton Lake, which gets an estimated 130,000 visitors during the festival. The highlight of the festival, the "Night glow" is held at the University of Waikato where an estimated 80,000+ people attend to watch the lighting of balloons putting on a spectacular glow to music.

Events 
Events in the festival include sunrise and sunset launches, a balloon basket glow in the city's Garden Place, the "Nightglow", a morning "Key Grab" competition where balloonists must attempt to secure a key placed on a pole in Innes Common and a Dawn Patrol where a select number of balloons inflate and lift off at dawn creating a magical glow in the sky.

Day 1: The Mass Ascension, Afternoon Flight
Day 2: Dawn Patrol, Breakfast as Dawn, Afternoon Flight
Day 3: Morning Flight, School Hop, City Burn
Day 4: Cash Grab, Nightglow
Day 5: Final Morning

History 
Balloons over Waikato won the Best Not for Profit at the Westpac Business Excellence Awards in 2008. In 2014, free bus services were offered for the night glow event. In 2015, Balloons Over Waikato was named Best Established Community Event at the New Zealand Association of Event Professionals awards ceremony. In 2017, a hot air balloon landed in the middle of a Hamilton intersection. In 2019, the event celebrated its 20th birthday. That same year, the City Burn event as part of Balloons Over Waikato was recorded as a summer month highlight. The ongoing COVID-19 pandemic saw the Nightglow not go forward in 2020 for the first time in its 21-year history, while the Innes Common morning showcases continued with no audience allowed.

See also
 Hot air balloon festivals

References

External links

Official website

Hot air balloon festivals
Tourist attractions in Hamilton, New Zealand
Sports festivals in New Zealand
Autumn events in New Zealand
Festivals in Hamilton, New Zealand
1999 introductions